The Battle of the Wines (fr. La Bataille des Vins), sometimes called "The Battle of the Blends" was a notable poem written by Henry d'Andeli in 1224 and tells the story of a famous wine tasting organized by the French king Philip Augustus. Over 70 samples from France and across Europe, including Cyprus, Spain and the Mosel region, were tasted and judged by an English priest. The priest classified the wines he tasted as either Celebrated for those which pleased him or Excommunicated for those that did not meet his standards. In the end a sweet wine from Cyprus (widely believed to be Commandaria) won the overall tasting and was awarded the supreme title of "Apostle".

Wines from France

Celebrated wines

 Laon
 Clermont
 Crouy
 Soissons
 Montmorency
 Hautvillers
 Épernay
 Argenteuil
 Deuil
 Pierrefitte
 Marly
 Trilbardou
 Sézanne
 Saint-Yon
 Samois
 Orléans
 Jargeau

 Tonnerre
 Auxerre
 Chablis
 Saint-Bris
 Vermenton
 Orchaise
 Vézelay
 Montrichard
 Lassay
 Sancerre
 Savigny
 Beaune
 Nevers
 Issoudun
 Châteauroux
 Buzançais
 Poitiers

 Chauvigny
 Saint-Pourçain
 La Rochelle
 Montmorillon
 Saint-Jean-d'Angély
 Taillebourg
 Saintes
 Angoulême
 Saint-Émilion
 Bordeaux
 Moissac
 Montpellier
 Béziers
 Carcassonne
 Narbonne

Excommunicated wines
 Chambilly
 Le Mans
 Rennes
 Étampes
 Argences
 Beauvais
 Châlons-sur-Marne

References

External links

1224 works
13th-century poems
French poems
Medieval French literature
Medieval wine
Philip II of France